Avreliya is a Russian non-canonical female first name. Its masculine version is Avrely.

In 1924–1930, the name was included into various Soviet calendars, which included new and often artificially created names.

Its diminutives include Avrelya, Relya, Yelya, and Ava.

References

Notes

Sources
Н. А. Петровский (N. A. Petrovsky). "Словарь русских личных имён" (Dictionary of Russian First Names). ООО Издательство "АСТ". Москва, 2005. 
А. В. Суперанская (A. V. Superanskaya). "Словарь русских имён" (Dictionary of Russian Names). Издательство Эксмо. Москва, 2005. 

